The 1938 United States Senate election in Iowa took place on November 8, 1938. Incumbent Democratic Senator Guy M. Gillette, who won a special election to complete the unexpired term of Richard Louis Murphy, won a full term in office by defeating Republican former Senator Lester J. Dickinson. Gillette and Dickinson had briefly served together in the final months of 1936.

Primary elections were held on June 6. Gillette overcame a primary challenge from U.S. Representative Otha Wearin, who was personally recruited by President Franklin D. Roosevelt given Gillette's opposition to New Deal programs. Dickinson defeated Representative Lloyd Thurston for the Republican nomination.

Democratic primary

Candidates
Wilson G. Byerhoff
Guy M. Gillette, incumbent Senator since 1936
Joseph J. Meyers
Mrs. Ellsworth Richardson
Otha Wearin, U.S. Representative from Glenwood

Results

Republican primary

Candidates
Lester J. Dickinson, former U.S. Senator (1931–37)
Lloyd Thurston, U.S. Representative from Osceola

Results

General election

Candidates
G.W. Bauseman (Prohibition)
George F. Buresh (Farmer-Labor)
Lester J. Dickinson, former U.S. Senator (1931–37) (Republican)
Guy M. Gillette, incumbent Senator since 1936 (Democratic)
Raymond E. Hanke (Progressive)

Results

See also 
 1938 United States Senate elections

References 

1938
Iowa
United States Senate